Malamirovo or Hambarli Inscription is a Bulgarian Greek inscription of around 813 AD, commemorating Bulgarian victories of Krum over the Byzantines, now preserved in the Varna Archaeological Museum.

Text

Translation

See also
Krum
Nikephoros I Logothetes
Battle of Versinikia 813 AD

References
Besevliev, V. 1963. Die Protobulgarischen Inschriften no. 2
Southeastern Europe in the Middle Ages, 500-1250 By Florin Curta Page 163

External links
http://mandara.narod.ru/nadpisi.htm (Хамбарлийски надпис - 2)
http://hellenisteukontos.blogspot.com/2009/05/malamirovo-bulgaria-813.html

Bulgarian Greek inscriptions
9th-century inscriptions
Medieval Thrace
Byzantine–Bulgarian Wars